Eurygaster is a genus of shield bugs widespread in Eurasia; some in North America.

Species in Europe 
 Eurygaster austriaca (Schrank, 1776)
 Eurygaster austriaca austriaca (Schrank, 1776)
 Eurygaster austriaca seabrai China, 1938
 Eurygaster dilaticollis Dohrn, 1860
 Eurygaster fokkeri Puton, 1893
 Eurygaster hottentotta (Fabricius, 1775)
 Eurygaster integriceps Puton, 1881
 Eurygaster maura (Linnaeus, 1758)
 Eurygaster minor Montandon, 1885
 Eurygaster testudinaria (Geoffroy, 1785)

Other species 
 Eurygaster alternata (Say, 1828)
 Eurygaster amerinda Bliven, 1956
 Eurygaster minidoka Bliven, 1956
 Eurygaster paderewskii Bliven, 1962
 Eurygaster shoshone Kirkaldy, 1909

References
Fauna europaea
British Bugs
Biolib
Insektenbox